Babb Creek is a  tributary of Pine Creek in Pennsylvania in the United States.

The tributary Stony Fork Creek joins Babb Creek just upstream of the community of Blackwell, 3.5 miles (5.6 km) upstream of Pine Creek.

Babb Creek joins Pine Creek at the community of Blackwell in Tioga County.

See also
List of rivers of Pennsylvania

References

Rivers of Pennsylvania
Rivers of Tioga County, Pennsylvania
Tributaries of Pine Creek (Pennsylvania)